"Goodnight Lovers" is Depeche Mode's thirty-ninth UK single, released on 11 February 2002. It is the fourth and final single for the album Exciter.

The single did not qualify for the UK Singles Chart because it contained three songs in addition to the single itself, one more than UK singles rules allow. It did however qualify for the Budget Albums Chart and went straight to Number One before falling rapidly, the first Depeche Mode single to reach Number One in an official UK chart.

The B-sides are remixes of "When the Body Speaks", "The Dead of Night", and "Goodnight Lovers".

The single was not released in the US.

Music video
The video features the band situated in a dark room with screens showing still images of the band members and the backup singers, who also feature in the video. It also shows Dave Gahan with longish hair.

Track listing

12": Mute / 12Bong33 (EU)
 "Goodnight Lovers" – 3:48
 "When the Body Speaks" (Acoustic) – 6:00
 "The Dead of Night" (Electronicat Remix) – 7:38
 "Goodnight Lovers" (isan Falling Leaf Mix) – 5:53
 The 12" exist as black and red vinyl.

CD: Mute / CDBong33 (UK)
 "Goodnight Lovers" – 3:48
 "When the Body Speaks" (Acoustic) – 6:00
 "The Dead of Night" (Electronicat Remix) – 7:38
 "Goodnight Lovers" (isan Falling Leaf Mix) – 5:53

All songs written by Martin L. Gore.

Charts

References

External links
 Single information from the official Depeche Mode web site
 Allmusic review

2002 singles
Depeche Mode songs
Songs written by Martin Gore
Mute Records singles